Chasing Pandora is a Maltese musical duo coming from Gozo. The duo consists of Melissa Portelli and Keith Anthony. Together they sing, play, and compose. Melissa is the vocalist and lyricist, while Keith Anthony is the guitarist and composer. Together they perform primarily as a simple voice and acoustic guitar duo.

Career
Both members displayed an affection for music from an early age. Keith started playing when he was 8; Melissa showed interest in poetry writing. As they began working together in music, they both revealed something new about themselves. Keith discovered an ability to write songs, Melissa discovered a soothing voice.

It all started when Melissa was singing in her office where she worked as a secretary. Her boss, Steve Brown, who happens to be the manager of the Scottish comedian Billy Connolly and a former Producer/Manager of Elton John at the time was setting up a home recording studio with the help of Keith. He immediately noticed her beautiful voice and asked Keith to compose something on acoustic guitar. Later on he asked Melissa to write the lyrics and a melody for the recording.

Steve Brown now manages and produces Chasing Pandora.

With the release of their debut album Mocking The Mocking Bird in 2007
they caused a stir with Feel the Rain which topped radio charts and CD sales in Malta.

Their next big hit, Memories, made it to many charts in Malta.  They also made a low budget video for this song, which was also their first video. Memories is sung by both members. Most of the other songs are sung solely by Melissa.

Mocking The Mocking Bird was re-released early 2009. It consists of new mixes and new songs.

The Driver and the Dancer, their latest album, was released on February 15, 2010.

Discography

Mocking The Mocking Bird
Debut Album May 1, 2007
 Bedroom
 Nothing She Said
 Blue Leather Chairs
 Mocking Bird
 I Know
 Divine
 Fully Loaded
 Bleed
 Daisy Lane
 Noisy Spaces
 Feel the Rain (their biggest hit.)
 Hush Little Baby

Two
E.P. June 2, 2008
 Only Yesterday
 No One Else
 Memories
 Me and You

Wide Eyed Beautiful
E.P. December 2008
 Wide Eyed Beautiful
 Someone
 You Don't Wanna Know
 Anywhere But Here

Mocking The Mocking BirdInternational Compilation June 2009 Bedroom
 You Don't Wanna Know
 Someone
 Only Yesterday
 Nothing She Said
 No One Else
 Divine
 I Know
 Mocking Bird
 Bleed
 Noisy Spaces
 Anywhere But Here
 Hush Little Baby

The Driver and the DancerFebruary 2010 Time
 The Tree
 Escape
 Lost Myself in You
 The Distance Between Us
 Running in Circles
 Dear John
 Burning Skies
 The Driver and the Dancer
 Dragonfly
 O Woman
 Sleep Baby Sleep

Quotes
 "The album contains unlimited talent and inspiration, my hairs stood on end and I was blown away with the intensity of it all."Peter Grech (Tune In Magazine) – about Mocking The Mocking Bird "All the songs are deeply engaging, it will be embraced by those with an ear for an alternative kind of pop for its sensitivity, delicate yet peculiarly uplifting essence."Michael Bugeja (Manic Magazine)  – about Mocking The Mocking Bird "There seem to be a free spirit with this excellent Maltese band that brings hope to a world stuffed full of hype and greed"Music Week Magazine "This should be released to enable access to a wider market – Forget 'in ya face' mainstream this is what popular music should be about"Rock Society Magazine "These Maltesers are an appetising prospect indeed"The Fly Magazine "Classy melodies, aching human emotion and considerable musicianship – repeated listening brings its own reward"Acoustic Magazine "Each song contains expressive, symbolic words and swimming pros – Chasing Pandora perform with imagination and great ease, they kept the audience engaged throughout the whole show, the only crowd noise was applause"The Independent newspaper''

External links
 Unofficial site: www.chasingpandora.com

Maltese musical groups
Maltese pop singers